Commonwealth Peak is a  mountain summit in the Spray Mountains, a sub-range of the Canadian Rockies in Alberta, Canada. The mountain is situated in Peter Lougheed Provincial Park. Its nearest higher peak is Mount Birdwood,  to the west. Both can be seen from Alberta Highway 742, also known as Smith-Dorrien/Spray Trail in Kananaskis Country.


History
Commonwealth Peak was named in 1979 to commemorate the 1978 Commonwealth Games that were held in Edmonton, Alberta.

The mountain's name was officially adopted in 1979 by the Geographical Names Board of Canada.

The first ascent of the peak was made in 1970 by Charlie Locke and Lloyd McKay.

Geology
Commonwealth Peak is composed of sedimentary rock laid down during the Precambrian to Jurassic periods. Formed in shallow seas, this sedimentary rock was pushed east and over the top of younger rock during the Laramide orogeny.

Climate
Based on the Köppen climate classification, Commonwealth Peak is located in a subarctic climate zone with cold, snowy winters, and mild summers.

Gallery

See also
Scrambles in the Canadian Rockies
Geography of Alberta

References

External links
 Weather: Commonwealth Peak
 Commonwealth Peak: Flickr photo

Two-thousanders of Alberta
Canadian Rockies
Alberta's Rockies